Nicholas Anthony Carter (born 29 September 1978) is a former English cricketer.  Carter was a right-handed batsman who bowled right-arm medium pace.  He was born at Truro, Cornwall.

Carter made his Minor Counties Championship debut for Cornwall in 1997 against Cheshire.  From 1997 to 2002, he represented the county in 4 Minor Counties Championship matches, the last of which came against Wales Minor Counties.  Carter also represented Cornwall in the MCCA Knockout Trophy.  His debut in that competition came against Devon in 2002.  From 2002 to 2003, he represented the county in 3 Trophy matches, the last of which came against Norfolk.

Carter also represented Cornwall in 2 List A matches.  These came against the Somerset Cricket Board and Wales Minor Counties in the 1st and 2nd rounds respectively of the 2003 Cheltenham & Gloucester Trophy which were played in 2002.  In his 2 List A matches, he scored 10 runs with a high score of 10*  and with the ball he took 3 wickets at a bowling average of 22.00, with best figures of 2/21.

References

External links

Nicholas Carter at Cricinfo
Nicholas Carter at CricketArchive

1978 births
Living people
Sportspeople from Truro
English cricketers
Cornwall cricketers